LUXT were an American electro-industrial group formed in Sacramento, California, United States by multi-instrumentalists Anna Christine and Erie Loch, with Loch composing the lyrics.

History
LUXT was formed out of Sacramento, California in 1995 by multi-instrumentalists Anna Christine and Erie Loch. Their 1996 debut album was titled Jezebel Thirteen Three and released by band's label Chalkhead Records. In 1997 the band was signed to 21st Circuitry and released their second album Disrepair in March. LUXT's third album Razing Eden followed a year later and was released by 21st Circuitry. It was viewed as a marked improvement over their previous work because of its higher production value and greater focus on hooks and melodies. In 2000 the band self-released another album for Chalkhead Records titled Chromasex Monkeydrive.

The band's fifth album American Beast was released in 2003 by Blackliner Records. In February of that year the album peaked on three [[CMJ New Music Monthly|CMJ'''s]] charts: "Loud Rock: College" at number nineteen, "Loud Rock: Crucial Spins" at number thirty-two and "CMJ Retail 100" at number ninety-one. After ten years together LUXT disbanded on April 15, 2005.

Discography
Studio albums
 Jezebel Thirteen Three (1996, Chalkhead)
 Disrepair (1997, 21st Circuitry)
 Razing Eden (1998, 21st Circuitry)
 Chromasex Monkeydrive (2000, Chalkhead)
 American Beast'' (2003, Blackliner)

References

External links 
 
 
 

Musical groups established in 1995
1995 establishments in California
Musical groups disestablished in 2005
2005 disestablishments in California
American alternative metal musical groups
American industrial metal musical groups
21st Circuitry artists